The River Pang is a small chalk stream river in the west of the English county of Berkshire, and a tributary of the River Thames.

The river, and its water voles, are thought to have inspired author Kenneth Grahame's character Ratty and his book The Wind in the Willows.

Course
The river's source is normally near the village of Compton, although the exact location varies depending on rainfall levels. In times of high rainfall it can be traced back to Farnborough, some four miles to the west-north-west, whilst at other times it may be as far downstream as the outfall from Hampstead Norreys sewage works.

From Compton the Pang flows south through the villages of Hampstead Norreys and Frilsham, before turning east to flow through the villages of Bucklebury, Stanford Dingley and Bradfield.

To the east of Bradfield the Pang is joined by the River Bourne and turns north to flow through the villages of Tidmarsh and Pangbourne, eventually entering the Thames between Whitchurch Lock and Whitchurch Bridge.

The valley of the River Pang between Compton and Bradfield is rather isolated, penetrated only by narrow country lanes. Because of this isolation, the valley has not become the residential commuter area that is much of Berkshire, and is still largely agricultural.

Wildlife
The Pang hosts a large quantity of wildlife, and plays its own part towards being a part of the community, especially within Pangbourne itself.

A concern in this river is the population of American signal crayfish, which have displaced the native white-clawed crayfish species.

The Berks, Bucks and Oxon Wildlife Trust owns a nature reserve straddling the Pang at Moor Copse, close to the village of Tidmarsh. A  extension to the nature reserve, in the area that is believed to have inspired Kenneth Grahame's work, was purchased in December 2006.

In August 2007 a coalition of the WWF, the National Trust, the RSPB and others called on the British government to adopt their Blueprint for Water. To publicize their campaign they highlighted the dangers to sites well known through literature such as The Lake District (Arthur Ransome's Swallows and Amazons and Beatrix Potter's Mrs Tiggy-Winkle), the North Kent Marshes (Charles Dickens's Great Expectations) and the River Pang.

Water quality
The Environment Agency measures the water quality of the river systems in England. Each is given an overall ecological status, which may be one of five levels: high, good, moderate, poor and bad. There are several components that are used to determine this, including biological status, which looks at the quantity and varieties of invertebrates, angiosperms and fish, and chemical status, which compares the concentrations of various chemicals against known safe concentrations. Chemical status is rated good or fail.

Water quality of the River Pang in 2019:

Etymology
The river is named after a man, thought to be an early Saxon chieftain, or tribe called Pǣga who lived there in the post-Roman era.

See also
 Tributaries of the River Thames
 List of rivers in England

References

Further reading

External links

 Mapsources: source of the river  and mouth 
 Pang Valley Countryside Project
 Kennet & Pang Fisheries Action Plan 

Rivers of Berkshire
West Berkshire District
1Pang